Paul Richard Abramson (born December 24, 1949, in Norwalk, Connecticut) is a UCLA psychology professor, expert witness, author, and musician.

Life and career 
The oldest son of Leonard Abramson and Ethel Esther Sakowitz, Abramson grew up in Norwalk, Connecticut, graduating from Norwalk High School in 1967. He received a bachelor's degree in psychology from the University of Miami in 1971, a master's degree in psychology from Connecticut College in 1973, and a Ph.D. in psychology from the University of Connecticut in 1976. His research focused on the interplay between sexuality and personality.  

In 1976, Abramson became an assistant professor of psychology at UCLA. He then moved through the ranks of associate and full professor at UCLA. Abramson taught courses on Art and Trauma (undergraduate), Human Sexuality (undergraduate and graduate), Independent Study (undergraduate and graduate), Introduction to Psychology (undergraduate), Personality (undergraduate and graduate), Personality Assessment (graduate), Sex and the Law (undergraduate and graduate) and Supervised Doctoral Research (graduate).

Abramson was also a visiting professor of psychology at Kyoto University in Japan in 1983, Editor of the Journal of Sex Research from 1988 to 1992, and Technical Advisor to the World Health Organization's Global Programme on AIDS in 1991. He received the Gold Medal Award for Feature Articles in Scholarly Journals in 1997, and KPFK’s Reading Service Helen Keller Award in 2013.

Abramson is married to Tania Love Abramson. He has two children.

With few exceptions, Abramson rarely conducted traditional psychological research. Problems were his bailiwick, and criticism his touchstone. He employed methods – mathematical models, narrative theories, constitutional scholarship, archival research, epidemiology, psychological interviews, ethnography, the philosophy of aesthetics – that suited the conundrums he grappled with.

Why is severe trauma so protracted and unpredictable? Are multiple one-night stands with a condom riskier than serial monogamy without them? Can the philosophy of aesthetics be extended to severe trauma? Why is sex so pleasurable? Why don't Americans have 9th amendment constitutionally protected sexual rights? How does a person who is blind experience sexual attraction? Why is sexual violence so ubiquitous?

Human Sexuality
Abramson, along with Donald Mosher, were among the first psychology professors to add scientific rigor to the study of human sexuality. Though Kinsey conducted research on the way Americans expressed their sexuality, and Masters & Johnson did the same for the underlying physiology, Abramson and Mosher extended this line of work by introducing psychological variables into the mix, guilt in particular. The experience of sexual guilt, for example, is one of the best ways to account for the variability in human sexual expression. Abramson expanded upon this research by studying this process cross-culturally, in Japan in particular. Many other studies on the psychology of human sexuality followed. Most notable of all, however, is the work he did on sexual pleasure with his former student Steven Pinkerton. Their book With Pleasure answers the most basic question about sex, namely, why does it feel so good? This book reframed the dialogue and research agenda on the study of sex.

HIV/AIDS Research
Having published a series of studies on genital herpes in the mid-1980s, Abramson was well positioned to transition into research on HIV/AIDS. Challenging some of the earlier epidemiological scenarios on the proliferation of HIV, Abramson and colleagues (notably Steve Pinkerton, Edward Kaplan and Bruce Rothschild) developed a Bernoulli process model of HIV infection and risk reduction, a mathematical model of AIDS education, and an alternative mathematical prediction of HIV infection. The importance of condoms were stressed throughout, including (in 1993) a series of challenges to the funding priorities underlying an HIV prevention vaccine to the exclusion of alternative prevention strategies, such as better condoms or HIV preventing gels. Abramson also served as a Technical Advisor to the World Health Organization's Global Program on AIDS.

Sex And The Law
The U.S. Constitution guarantees certain fundamental rights, such as the freedoms of speech and religious expression. But what guarantees our sexual freedoms? The text of the Constitution makes no reference to sex, family, or procreation. Though the right to privacy is tangential to sex, it is not in the Constitution or a putative sexual right either. It is simply a barrier to being observed or intruded upon by the government without just cause. Sexual conduct per se is still perceived as having no Constitutional protection whatsoever.

Abramson is trying to change that through his books and teaching. Arguing that sexual freedom is cut from the same cloth as other freedoms protected by the Bill of Rights, Abramson and his former students (Steve Pinkerton and Mark Huppin) argued (in the book Sexual Rights in America) that the freedom to choose how, when and with whom to express sexuality is a quintessential right protected by the Ninth Amendment. The Ninth Amendment states the following: “the enumeration in the Constitution, of certain rights, shall not be construed to deny or disparage others retained by the people.” Abramson wryly notes that without sexual rights, there would be no “people.” More importantly, he asserts that the manner in which we make choices about sex (among consenting adults and void of tangible harm) is the way we exercise this fundamental right protected by the Ninth Amendment (and extended to States by the Fourteenth Amendment.)

Abramson extended this argument in a second book titled Romance in the Ivory Tower: The rights and liberty of conscience. He asserted that the choices we make about love and sex are no less intimate or deeply personal as the choices we make about God or religion. Together with the Ninth Amendment, and the right to privacy, the rights and liberty of conscience combine to create a zone of personal autonomy that is immune from governmental intrusion; including decisions or actions related sex, God or love.

To further this area of inquiry, Abramson also created at UCLA the first class in the United States devoted to the study of the interface between sex and the law, as it relates to criminal, civil, and constitutionally relevant litigation.

Child Sexual Abuse
Abramson's 1984 book, Sarah: A Sexual Biography was one of the first in-depth psychological portrayals of the ravages of childhood sexual abuse. A true-life story, it was also a testimonial to the psychological survival of the victim. Though Americans have grown accustomed to the enormity of childhood sexual abuse through its depiction in newspapers, novels, memoirs and movies, this was not the case in 1984. When the Los Angeles Times reviewed the book shortly after publication it remarked, “How can so much intimate, destructive violence be part of our here and now, almost before our eyes? No novelist would dare, because fiction can neither resolve, nor even make reasonable, this material.”

Abramson continued to write about the impact of childhood sexual abuse, most notably the nation's largest child pornography case which involved over 3000 images of children, discovered at the home of the director of a prominent preschool. Another book he wrote about this subject matter, with co-author Steven Pinkerton (a psychiatry professor at the Medical College of Wisconsin), is A House Divided: Suspicions of mother-daughter incest.  The book details a child sexual molestation case (drawn from his three decades of serving as an expert witness in civil and criminal litigation) gone shockingly awry, and concludes with recommendations for policy changes to minimize false accusations.

Film
Together with his former wife, photographer Ann Purdy, Abramson wrote and directed the short experimental film Regret is My Demon that premiered at the Santa Barbara International Film Festival in 2008. Composed almost entirely of still photographs with voice-over narration, Regret is My Demon tells the story of a teenage girl who blames herself for her mother's heroin addiction and untimely death. Chris Marker's La Jetee (1962), Edgar Allan Poe's "The Fall of the House of Usher" and Cindy Sherman's Untitled Film Stills (1977–1982) are obvious influences. Regret is My Demon was produced and edited by Blisss Productions.

Music
Abramson is the lead singer and lyricist of the band Crying 4 Kafka. They have six CDs, all produced by Paul du Gre for the record labels Waiting for Godzilla and Hellflowers in LA. Additional songs were produced by Abramson and Ian Putnam for Vending Machine Sound. The CDs and songs are available on iTunes.

Abramson wrote the play The Saint of Fucked Up Karma (2017). He also composed the music with Robin Finck of Nine Inch Nails and Crying 4 Kafka. The Saint of Fucked Up Karma was performed as a musical in Los Angeles and Santa Barbara, California in 2013.

Books

 Abramson, P.R. (2017) Screwing Around with Sex: Essays, Indictments, Anecdotes, and Asides. Joshua Tree, CA.: Asylum 4 Renegades Press.
 Abramson, P.R. (2010). Sex Appeal: Six Ethical Principles for the 21st Century. New York: Oxford University Press.
 Abramson, P.R. (2007). Romance in the Ivory Tower: The Rights and Liberties of Conscience. Cambridge, MA: MIT Press.
 Abramson, P.R., Pinkerton, S.D. & Huppin, M. (2003). Sexual Rights in America: The Ninth Amendment and the Pursuit of Happiness. New York: NYU Press.
 Abramson, P.R. & Pinkerton, S.D. (2000). A House Divided: Suspicions of Mother-Daughter Incest. New York: W.W. Norton.
 Abramson, P.R. & Pinkerton, S.D. (1995). With Pleasure: Thoughts on the Nature of Human Sexuality. New York: Oxford University Press.
 Abramson, P.R. & Pinkerton, S.D. (Eds.) (1995). Sexual Nature/Sexual Culture. Chicago: University of Chicago Press.
 Abramson, P. R. (1991) A Case for Case Studies: An Immigrant's Journal. California: Sage Publications, Inc.
Abramson, P. R. & Pinkerton, S.D. (1984). Sarah: A Sexual Biography. Albany, N.Y.: State University of New York Press.
Murray, J. & Abramson, P.R. (Eds.) (1983). Bias in Psychotherapy. New York: Praeger.
Abramson, P.R. (1980) Personality: The Heuristic Perspective. New York: Holt, Rinehart & Winston.

Drawing 
Abramson's drawings illustrate two books, The Saint of Fucked Up Karma (2017) and Erika Blair's The Sanctity of Rhyme: The Metaphysics of Crying 4 Kafka (2018).

Journalism 
Abramson has written for the Boston Globe, LA Times, and the LA Weekly.

 Abramson, P.R. (June 18, 2003). No More Amour With UC Faculty? LA Times
 Abramson, P.R. (September 30, 2007). The Right to Romance. The Boston Globe
 Abramson, P.R. & Dautch, L. (November 23, 2014). Waiting Until College to Teach About Affirmative Consent is Too Late. LA Times
 Abramson, P.R. & Williamson, L.J. (January 27, 2011). Give Sodomy A Chance. LA Weekly
 Abramson, P.R. & Williamson, L.J. (February 9, 2012). Condoms Suck. LA Weekly
 Abramson, P.R. & Williamson, L.J. (March 15, 2012) Condoms Still Suck, No Matter What Joycelyn Elders Thinks (She's on Trojan's Payroll). LA Weekly
 Abramson, P.R. & Williamson, L.J. (April 19, 2012). Blackjack With Pedophiles: Why Gambling on Our Ability to Stop Sex Offenders Isn't the Way to Go. LA Weekly

References

External links
 Amazon.com's Paul Abramson Page
 L.A. Weekly Article on Paul Abramson
Professor Paul R. Abramson Website
Dr. Paul R. Abramson Expert Witness Website

1949 births
Living people
21st-century American psychologists
20th-century American psychologists